The nano-abacus is a nano-sized abacus developed by IBM scientists. Stable rows made up of ten molecules act as the railings of the abacus.  The beads are made up of fullerenes and are pushed around by the tip of a scanning tunneling microscope. The nano-abacus has the potential to be used in a variety of nanotechnological inventions such as the nano-computer.

Nanotechnology